The University of Technology Sydney (UTS) is a public research university located in Sydney, New South Wales, Australia. Although its origins are said to trace back to the 1830s, the university was founded in its current form in 1988. As of 2021, UTS enrols 45,221 students through its 9 faculties and schools.

The university is regarded as one of the world's leading young universities (under 50 years old), ranked 1st in Australia and 11th in the world by the 2021 QS World University Rankings Young Universities.

UTS is a founding member of the Australian Technology Network, and is a member of Universities Australia and the Worldwide Universities Network.

History
The University of Technology Sydney originates from the Sydney Mechanics' School of Arts (the oldest continuously running Mechanics' Institute in Australia), which was established in 1833. In the 1870s, the School formed the Workingman's College, which was later taken over by the NSW government to form, in 1882, the Sydney Technical College.

In 1940 the NSW Parliament passed an Act to establish an Institute of Technology, which in 1964 led to the establishment of the New South Wales Institute of Technology (NSWIT). In 1968, the NSW Institute of Technology amalgamated with the NSW Institute of Business Studies. In 1976 NSWIT established the first law school in NSW outside the university sector. The Haymarket campus officially opened in 1985.

On 8 October 1987 university status was granted to NSWIT, which was followed by the passing of the University of Technology, Sydney, Act 1987. It was reconstituted as the University of Technology Sydney (UTS) on 26 January 1988, along with the incorporation of the School of Design of the former Sydney College of the Arts. In 1989, the University of Technology, Sydney, Act 1989 (NSW) formed UTS by absorbing the Kuring-gai College of Advanced Education (KCAE) and the Institute of Technical and Adult Teacher Education (ITATE) of the Sydney College of Advanced Education. By 1991, an academic structure of nine faculties and 25 schools was established.

The School of Design was initially housed at a campus in Balmain, which closed at the end of 1994, with the school moved to a new building at the city campus. The environmental, biological and biomedical science schools were located on a campus at St Leonards, which was closed in 2006, which also relocated to the city campus following a redevelopment.

The Kuring-Gai campus closed at the end of 2015, with classes and facilities moved into the main Haymarket campus. This marked the consolidation of UTS into a single unified campus in the Sydney CBD.

Campus

The UTS city campus is located at the southern border of Sydney's central business district, close to Central station and Railway Square. The UTS Tower is the nucleus of the city campus, fronting on to Broadway.

The campus consists of five distinct precincts. Broadway, Haymarket and Blackfriars are located at the city campus, while precincts at Moore Park and Botany integrate specialist facilities with surrounding industry organisations.

Broadway (located in Ultimo) is home to the faculties of Science, Health, Law, Arts and Social Sciences, Engineering and IT, and Design, Architecture and Building, as well as the UTS Library. Haymarket is the location of the Business School, UTS Startups, the UTS Animal Logic Academy and two lecture theatres in the Powerhouse Museum. The Blackfriars precinct in Chippendale contains the Blackfriars Children's Centre and research and innovation teams while the Moore Park precinct features sports facilities within the Rugby Australia Building and the Botany precinct consists of the specialist research facility UTS Tech Lab.

The campus has been substantially transformed since 2008 by the university's City Campus Master Plan, a $1 billion-plus investment in new buildings and facilities, major upgrades and refurbishments.

Buildings and architecture

The UTS Tower on Broadway (Building 1) is an example of brutalist architecture with square and block concrete designs. Completed and officially opened in 1979 by Premier Neville Wran, the Tower initially housed the NSW Institute of Technology, which transformed to become UTS in the late 1980s. In October 2006, the UTS Tower was voted the ugliest building in Sydney in a poll hosted by The Sydney Morning Herald, receiving 22% of the total vote. The Tower is the largest campus building in terms of both height and floor space.

Other notable buildings in the Broadway precinct include:

 Building 2, UTS Central, is intended as a central hub for the campus. Opened in August 2019, the 17-storey building is encased in glass and includes the UTS Library, the Faculty of Law, the Hive Super Lab, three large collaborative classrooms, student spaces and a food court. The new food court includes outlets such as Mad Mex, Chatime, PapaRich and Uni Bros, and all single-use plastic packaging has been replaced with fully compostable, reusable or recyclable alternatives. It was designed by Australian architectural firm Francis-Jones Morehan Thorp.
 Building 3, the Bon Marche Building, which dates to the 1890s and was named after the Parisian department store Le Bon Marché. Originally a department store operated by Marcus Clark & Co, the building now accommodates specialist facilities for the Faculty of Arts and Social Sciences.
 Building 7, or the Vicki Sara Building, home to Faculty of Science administration and specialist facilities, and the Graduate School of Health. Designed by architects Durbach Block Jaggers, in association with BVN Architecture, it has been awarded a 6 Star Green Star Design and As-Built rating, certified by the Green Building Council of Australia, and includes many sustainable features including a rooftop garden with stormwater collection and recycled building materials.
 Building 10 on Jones St colloquially known as 'the Fairfax Building' as it originally accommodated the printing facilities for the Fairfax-owned Sydney Morning Herald. It was later home to the Sydney Organising Committee for the Olympic Games (SOCOG), before being incorporated within the UTS campus in the early 2000s. It accommodates the Faculty of Arts and Social Sciences and the Faculty of Health. The refurbished building received the 2003 Sir John Sulman Award for Public Architecture.
 Building 11, which opened in 2014 and accommodates the Faculty of Engineering and IT, along with many of its specialist facilities. Designed by architects Denton Corker Marshall, the building is encased in aluminium screens perforated with binary code. 'Gills' creased into the aluminium plates light up at night and symbolically represent the building as a living, breathing structure.
 Alumni Green, the central green space on campus, encircled by prominent campus buildings including the Tower. Designed by landscape architects ASPECT Studio, Alumni Green consists of three distinct zones: a garden area with outdoor seating; a paved open space modelled on celebrated town squares; and a 1200m2 raised grass platform, which creates a green roof for a 13,000m2 underground Library Retrieval System.

The Haymarket precinct includes buildings such as:

 Building 5, former market buildings with a heritage façade and modern interior. 
 Building 8, the Dr Chau Chak Wing Building, is the first Australian building designed by celebrated architect Frank Gehry and is considered a contemporary architectural icon. The building accommodates teaching, learning, research and office space for the UTS Business School. Design features include a prominent polished stainless steel staircase that acts as a sculptural focal point in the main lobby, undulating brickwork with approximately 320,000 individual bricks referencing Sydney sandstone laid by hand and two oval classrooms constructed of large laminated timber beams.

Additionally in the Moore Park precinct, the Rugby Australia Building contains specialist facilities for UTS students, staff and researchers working across sport and exercise science, physiotherapy and sport media. Designed by architects Populous, the building is also the headquarters of Rugby Australia and home to Australia's national rugby teams. The external fixed aluminium shading controls solar penetration, while internal spaces include the purpose-built laboratories of the Human Performance Research Centre.

A number of UTS campus buildings have received a certified Green Star rating from the Green Building Council of Australia.  The Vicki Sara Building has been awarded a 6 Star Green Star Design and As-Built Rating, while the Faculty of Engineering and IT and Dr Chau Chak Wing Buildings has been awarded 5 stars.

UTS Library

UTS provides library services through the UTS Library and Reading Room in Building 2 (UTS Central), as well as a range of online services on the UTS Library website.

UTS Art Collection
The UTS Gallery and Art Collection contains over 850 works, with a focus on contemporary Australian and Indigenous art. The artworks from the collection are on display throughout the UTS campus, including in every building.

The university has been expanding its collection of digital and new media works. UTS Central is home to a 12-metre wide digital screen, which showcases large-scale digital artworks by leading Australian artists.

Neighbouring organisations 
The core of the UTS city campus is located close to many Sydney landmarks and notable organisations including the Australian Broadcasting Corporation, the Powerhouse Museum, TAFE Ultimo, the International Convention Centre Sydney, Darling Harbour and Chinatown.

Entities within the Central Park development, opposite the UTS Tower on Broadway, partner with the University on sustainability initiatives, which include a recycled water partnership and a district energy-sharing project commended at the 2018 Smart City Awards.

Organisation and administration

Faculties and schools
The university consists of nine faculties and schools:
Faculty of Arts and Social Sciences
School of Business
Faculty of Design, Architecture and Building
Faculty of Engineering and Information Technology
Graduate School of Health
Faculty of Health
Faculty of Law
Faculty of Science
School of Transdisciplinary Innovation

Other entities
In addition to the faculties, there are a number other units falling under the Provost and Senior Vice-President's division, within the remit of the Vice-Chancellor and President. , these comprise three administrative units (Planning and Quality Unit, UTS Internal Audit and Chief Data Officer), as well as the:
Centre for Social Justice and Inclusion. 
Jumbunna Institute for Indigenous Education and Research (formerly Jumbunna Indigenous House of Learning).

The Graduate Research School, Institute for Public Policy and Governance, and the Institute for Sustainable Futures fall under the Deputy Vice-Chancellor and Vice-President (Research), a number of units relating to international students are governed by the Deputy Vice-Chancellor and Vice-President (International), and many other administrative units exist under similar divisions under the Vice-Chancellor and President.

Governance
The UTS Academic Board is the principal advisory body to the UTS Council on academic matters.

The Academic Board is concerned with policy development as it relates to the University's academic programs in education, scholarship and research, and community service. It refers to policy recommendations to Council and discusses matters referred to it by Council.

Academic Board plays a key role in the UTS community in providing a forum for the discussion and debate of the academic directions of the University as well as the quality of its academic programs. The Board consists of academic staff members as well as student members elected for a general period of 1–2 years.

 List of Chancellors 
 Peter Johnson (1989—1999)
 Sir Gerard Brennan (1999—2005)
 Vicki Sara (2005—2016)
 Catherine Livingstone (2016—present)

 List of Vice-Chancellors
 Gus (Roy David) Guthrie (1988—1996)
 Tony (Anthony John Dyson) Blake (1996—2002)
 Ross Milbourne (2002—2014)
 Attila Brungs (2014—2021)
 Andrew Parfitt (2021—present)

Academics

Admissions

As of 2023, UTS had the third highest demand for places in New South Wales for university applicants.

For domestic applications, an Australian Tertiary Admission Rank (ATAR) is required, with selection ranks varying between courses. Applicants may also be eligible for admission if they have completed a UTS foundation course or an AQF Diploma. Applicants applying with an IB Diploma will have their scores converted into a UAC Rank for admission.

In 2023, statistics by the Universities Admissions Centre (UAC) revealed that the Bachelor of Business program at UTS was the second most in-demand course in the state, with 877 applicants placing it as their first preference. The Bachelor of Nursing program was the eight most in-demand course with 649 applicants.

Rankings

The 2023 QS World University Rankings ranked UTS 9th in Australia and 137th in the world. UTS is ranked 9th in Australia and 133rd in the world by the 2023 Times Higher Education World University Rankings. The 2022 U.S. News & World Report Best Global Universities Rankings ranked UTS 9th in Australia and 127th in the world. The university is ranked in the 201st–300th bracket in the 2021 Academic Ranking of World Universities.

UTS ranked 1st in Australia and 8th globally in the 2022 Times Higher Education Young University Rankings (under 50 years old). Similarly, in the 2021 QS Top 50 Under 50 Rankings of universities founded less than 50 years ago, UTS ranked 11th in the world and 1st in Australia.

The Times Higher Education Rankings in 2022 ranked UTS; 70th in Computer Science, 81st in Law and 90th in Education in the world. In Australia, UTS is ranked 4th in Computer Science, 7th in Law and 8th in Education.

The QS World University Rankings in 2021 ranked UTS; 11th in Nursing, 25th in Arts and Design and 29th in Sport and Exercise in the world. UTS is ranked in the top 100 for Accounting and Finance, Architecture, Civil Engineering, Communication & Media Studies, Computer Science, Electrical Engineering and Law.

The US News Rankings in 2022 ranked UTS; 8th in Electrical Engineering, 13th in Computer Science, 31st in Energy and Fuels, 46th in Chemical Engineering, 52nd in Civil Engineering, 62nd in Biotechnology, 83rd in Economics and 87th in Ecology. In Australia, UTS is ranked 1st in the subject areas of Electrical Engineering and Computer Science, 2nd in Energy and Fuels, 3rd in Chemical Engineering, 4th in Biotechnology, 6th in Civil Engineering, 7th in Economics and 11th in Ecology.

The 2022 QS Graduate Employability Rankings ranked UTS graduates 5th most employable in Australia, and 62nd in the world.

Research
UTS is home to over 50 research centres and institutes. UTS mainly focuses its research in the areas of health, data science, sustainability, future work and industry and social futures.

Some of the major research centres include; the Centre for Artificial Intelligence, Centre for Autonomous System, Centre for Health Technology, Advanced Analytics Institute, Centre for Forensic Science, Centre for Quantum Software and Information Technology, the Australian Institute for Microbiology & Infection (AIMI, formerly the i3 Institute), Climate Change Cluster (C3) and the Institute for Sustainable Future.

Student body

In 2021, the university had an enrolment of 45,221 students. 33,117 are undergraduate students, 9,778 postgraduate students and 2,326 doctoral students. Of all students, 33,277 (73.6%) are Australian citizens or permanent residents and 11,944 (26.4%) are international students.

Students were enrolled in 9 schools or faculties: The largest being the School of Business at 23.7 percent followed by the Faculty of Engineering and Information Technology at 23 percent. Other faculties and schools by enrolment include; 11.3 percent in the Faculty of Arts and Social Sciences; 10.9 percent in the Faculty of Design, Architecture & Building (DAB); 9.6 percent in the Faculty of science and 6.2 percent in the School of Law. Smaller number of students are enrolled in the Graduate School of Health and School of Transdisciplinary Innovation.

Student life
ActivateUTS (formerly UTS Union) operates a range of on-campus student services, including food and beverage outlets, cultural activities, fitness and catering services as well as clubs and societies, student publications and Orientation Day. The City Campus is home to two licensed bars, 'The Underground' and 'The Loft'.

ActivateUTS is governed by a board of thirteen directors consisting of seven students (elected by the student cohort in annual elections), two staff members (elected by the staff of the university), the CEO of ActivateUTS, the chair (appointed by the university council), the treasurer (appointed by the university council) and one other director (appointed by the university council, usually external to the university or a former student). From the seven students elected, a president and a vice-president is elected each year by the board. The chair is responsible for the conduct of the board meetings.

Clubs and societies
The University of Technology Sydney recognises over 130 clubs and societies. 6,784 students were involved in a club or society in 2021.

During Orientation Day in 2020, there were over 6,765 club membership purchases from 3,505 students, up nearly 200% from the previous year.

Media
UTS has its own community radio station on campus, 2SER FM. The studio is located in building 18, known as the terraces, and broadcasts to the entire Sydney region. The station is jointly owned by UTS and Macquarie University, with a second studio at Macquarie University. UTS Journalism students help produce the station's news and current affairs programs including "The Wire" and "Razors Edge".

The UTS Students' Association is the representative student organisation at UTS. It publishes the student newspaper, Vertigo, runs the second hand bookshop and advocates on behalf of students both individually and collectively.

Sport

The University of Technology Sydney's sports teams are overseen by UTS Sport. The university sponsors 35 sports clubs, which together has over 4,700 members. Its sports clubs play in a variety of sports, including Australian rules football, basketball, cricket, hockey, netball, rowing, rugby union, soccer, tennis, volleyball and water polo.

UTS were the overall champion at the UniSport Nationals on two occasions (2016, 2017), and were awarded the Spirit of the Games Shield (now known as the John White Spirit Trophy) in 1995. UTS were the overall champion at the Indigenous Nationals on two occasions (2003, 2019). UTS were the overall champion at the Nationals Snow in 2022, and were awarded the Spirit of the Mountain Award in 2019.

Notable alumni

The University of Technology Sydney has over 260,000 alumni worldwide. The university has been home to several Fulbright Scholars, John Monash Scholars, and one Rhodes Scholar.

Several notable alumni have served as politicians at either federal, state or local level, including former Deputy Leader of the Opposition Tanya Plibersek, former Premier of New South Wales Morris Iemma, former Leader of the Opposition in New South Wales John Robertson and former Deputy Lord Mayor of Sydney Henry Tsang.

Notable alumni in arts and entertainment include actor Hugh Jackman, actress Rachel Ward, actor and comedian Anh Do, actress Natasha Liu Bordizzo, dancer and singer Emma Watkins, comedy writer and performer Chris Taylor, actress Charlotte Best and media personality Sonia Kruger.

Other notable alumni include businessman David Murray, journalist and anchor Lynda Kinkade, former Crown Prosecutor of New South Wales Margaret Cunneen, cricketer Pat Cummins, businessman Russell Balding, entertainment journalist Brooke Boney, author Janine Shepherd, cricketer Alyssa Healy, economist Cristina Cifuentes, sports journalist Lara Pitt, author Kate Grenville, investigative journalist Caro Meldrum-Hanna, and businesswoman Kim McKay.

See also

 List of universities in Australia
 UTS Glenda Adams Award for New Writing, a literary award sponsored by UTS

References

External links

 
 ActivateUTS website
 UTS Sport website

 
Universities in Sydney
Australian Technology Network
1988 establishments in Australia
Educational institutions established in 1988
Ultimo, New South Wales
Buildings and structures awarded the Sir John Sulman Medal
Railway Square, Sydney